Kharagpur railway division is one of the four railway divisions under South Eastern Railway zone of Indian Railways. This railway division was formed on 14 April 1952 and its headquarters are located at Kharagpur in the state of West Bengal of India.

Adra railway division, Chakradharpur railway division and Ranchi railway division are the other three railway divisions under SER Zone headquartered at Kolkata.

List of railway stations and towns 
The list includes the stations under the Kharagpur railway division and their station category. 

Stations closed for Passengers -

References

 
1952 establishments in West Bengal
Transport in Kharagpur